Rummo is an Estonian surname. Notable bearers include:

Paul-Eerik Rummo (born 1942), poet and politician
Jüri Rummo (1856–?; better known as Rummu Jüri), outlaw and folk hero
Vello Rummo (1921–2009), theatre director and pedagogue

See also
Rummu (disambiguation)

Estonian-language surnames